Oliver Nicola Hegi (born 20 February 1993) is a Swiss male artistic gymnast and a member of the national team. He participated at the 2015 World Artistic Gymnastics Championships in Glasgow, and qualified for the 2016 Summer Olympics.

References

External links 
 

1993 births
Living people
Swiss male artistic gymnasts
People from Biel/Bienne
Gymnasts at the 2010 Summer Youth Olympics
Gymnasts at the 2016 Summer Olympics
Olympic gymnasts of Switzerland
European champions in gymnastics
Sportspeople from the canton of Bern
21st-century Swiss people